Bay of Islands is a former New Zealand parliamentary electorate. It existed during various periods between 1853 and 1993. It was thus one of the original 24 electoral districts, and New Zealand's first ever MP was elected, although unopposed, in the Bay of Islands; Hugh Carleton thus liked to be called the Father of the House.

Population centres
The previous electoral redistribution was undertaken in 1875 for the 1875–1876 election. In the six years since, New Zealand's European population had increased by 65%. In the 1881 electoral redistribution, the House of Representatives increased the number of European representatives to 91 (up from 84 since the 1875–76 election). The number of Māori electorates was held at four. The House further decided that electorates should not have more than one representative, which led to 35 new electorates being formed, and two electorates that had previously been abolished to be recreated, including Bay of Islands. This necessitated a major disruption to existing boundaries.

The electorate is centred on the Bay of Islands in the Northland Region, and includes the following population centres: Kerikeri.

History
Hugh Carleton was elected to the seat in the first New Zealand Parliament in 1853. Although he was elected unopposed, he was the first MP elected and liked to be called Father of the House. He represented the seat until 1870, when he was defeated.

The Bay of Islands electorate existed from 1853 to 1870, then from 1881 to 1946 (when it was replaced by the Hobson electorate), then from 1978 to 1993, after which it became the Far North electorate. In 1996 it became the Northland electorate.

Members representing the electorate from 1881 to 1922 were Richard Hobbs 1881–1890 (retired), Robert Houston 1890–1908 (retired), Vernon Reed 1908–1915 (election declared void) and 1917–1922 (defeated), and William Stewart 1915–1917(resigned). In 1929, Harold Rushworth, a Country Party member, had his 1928 election declared void, but he won the subsequent by-election.

The  was contested by Robert Houston, James Trounsen, John Lundon and Joseph Dargaville, and they received 465, 454, 385 and 352 votes, respectively. Houston, who represented the Liberal Party, was thus declared elected.

The  was contested by Houston (1431 votes), Trownson (1200 votes) and Dargaville (399 votes). The incumbent was thus re-elected.

The  was contested by Houston (1592 votes) and John Press (965 votes). The incumbent was again re-elected.

Houston was succeeded by Vernon Reed, who represented the Liberal Party in the 1908 and s. The opposition candidate in 1908 was John Charles Johnson, and by 1911 the Reform Party had established itself and George Wilkinson was their candidate.

Harold Rushworth of the Country Party represented the electorate from the  onwards. On 7 October 1935, Russell died in a rifle accident on his farm. The United Party selected Clive Cameron as their replacement candidate.

Members of Parliament
Key

Election results

1943 election

1938 election

1935 election

1931 election

1929 by-election

1928 election

1925 election

1922 election

1919 election

1915 by-election

1914 election

 
 
 
 
 

 

Table footnotes:

1911 election

1908 election

1893 election

1890 election

1884 election

Notes

References

Historical electorates of New Zealand
1853 establishments in New Zealand
1993 disestablishments in New Zealand
1870 disestablishments in New Zealand
1881 establishments in New Zealand
1978 establishments in New Zealand
1946 disestablishments in New Zealand